Iodotoluene is a group of three isomeric chemical compounds.  They (ortho-iodotoluene, meta-iodotoluene, and para-iodotoluene) consist of a disubstituted benzene ring with one iodine atom and one methyl group.

Properties 
The isomers differ in the location of the iodine, but have the same chemical formula.

Benzyl iodide is an isomer, which has a iodine substituted for one of the hydrogens of toluene's methyl group, and it is sometimes named α-bromoiodine.

Preparation
A laboratory route to o- and p-iodotoluene proceeds from toluene, which is treated with a mixture of iodine and nitric acid in an electrophilic aromatic substitution. The resulting mixture of o and p-iodotoluene is then separated by fractional freezing; cooling the mixture in an ice bath results in solidification of p-iodotoluene, which can then be isolated by filtration, while the o-iodotoluene remains behind as a liquid.

Uses
Iodotoluenes are precursors to many organic building blocks. For example, the methyl group of o-iodotoluene and p-iodotoluene may be oxidized using potassium permanganate to form 2-iodobenzoic acid and 4-iodobenzoic acid, respectively.

See also
Chlorotoluene
Bromotoluene

References 

Iodobenzenes
Alkyl-substituted benzenes
Multiple compounds, tabular